is the sixth studio album by the Japanese girl group Berryz Kobo. It was released on March 31, 2010 on the Piccolo Town label, and peaked at #12 on the weekly Oricon chart. The album was released in two editions: a normal edition and a limited edition. The first pressing of the normal edition contained a bonus photocard, while the limited edition came with a special DVD containing two versions of the PV for "Tomodachi wa Tomodachi Nanda!", as well as additional footage. Both editions also contained a ticket to the album's release event. The album features seven of the group's previous singles, as well as five original tracks.

The album's theme is "not a child, but not yet an adult."

Track listings

Charts

References

External links
6th Otakebi Album at the official Hello! Project discography
6th Otakebi Album at the Up-Front Works discography listing

Berryz Kobo albums
2010 albums